Cambarus hamulatus, the prickly cave crayfish, is a freshwater crayfish native to Tennessee and Alabama in the United States. It is a cave-dwelling species known from 40 caves across its range.

References

Cambaridae
Cave crayfish
Freshwater crustaceans of North America
Crustaceans described in 1881
Taxa named by Edward Drinker Cope